Anne Sargeant, OAM (born 28 December 1957) is a retired Australian netball player and current sports commentator. Sargeant played in the Australian national team from 1978 to 1988, captaining the side for six years.

After her retirement from competitive netball, Sargeant has had a successful career as a columnist, motivational speaker and sports commentator, and also runs a netball program for young players. Sargeant's representations have included the Australian Sports Commission, the NSW Australia Day Council, Children's Week, Board Member of McDonald's, School Sport 2000 Committee and Patron of the 1994 Year of the Coach. 

In 2008 she was a commentator for Fox Sports - ANZ Championship coverage. Sargeant also has been a commentator at various Netball World Cup tournaments and returned to commentate the 2013 and 2014 ANZ Championship seasons. Sargeant is also current selector for the Australian National team.

Recognition
1987 – Athlete member of the Sport Australia Hall of Fame
1988 – NSW Hall of Champions.
1988 – Medal of the Order of Australia for service to netball.
2000 – Australian Sports medal.
2004 – Sydney's Greatest Ever Netballer.
2008 – One of the first inductees into the Australian Netball Hall of Fame
2015 – Legend member of the Sport Australia Hall of Fame

References

External links
Anne Sargeant website.

1957 births
Living people
Australian motivational speakers
Recipients of the Medal of the Order of Australia
Sport Australia Hall of Fame inductees
Australia international netball players
Netball players at the 1985 World Games
Netball players from New South Wales
Australian netball players
Australian netball coaches
Esso/Mobil Superleague coaches
Australian netball commentators
1979 World Netball Championships players
1983 World Netball Championships players
1987 World Netball Championships players